Condensin-2 complex subunit D3 (CAP-D3) also known as non-SMC condensin II complex subunit D3 (NCAPD3) is a protein that, in humans, is encoded by the NCAPD3 gene. CAP-D3 is a subunit of condensin II, a large protein complex involved in chromosome condensation.

References

Further reading

Human proteins